Sakuragi (written: 桜木 or 桜樹 lit. "cherry blossom tree") is a Japanese surname. Notable people with the surname include::

 Chisako Sakuragi, a writer and illustrator of manga
 J. R. Sakuragi, born as J. R. Henderson, an American-Japanese professional basketball player
 Rui Sakuragi, a Japanese actress in adult videos ('AV idol')
 , Japanese writer
 Yuji Sakuragi, a Japanese sportsman engaged in several fighting sports (mixed martial arts, wrestling, kick-boxing)
 Yukiya Sakuragi, a writer and illustrator of manga

Fictional characters:
 Hanamichi Sakuragi, the main character in the sports-themed manga series Slam Dunk
 Matsuri Sakuragi, a character in the manga and comedy series 
 Naohito Sakuragi, a character in the manga series Fruits Basket
 Rokurouta Sakuragi, an important character in the manga series Rainbow: Nisha Rokubō no Shichinin
 Tatsuya Sakuragi, a character in Shiritsu Bakaleya Koukou, a live action TV series

See also
 Sakuragi Station (Chiba)
 Sakuragi Station (Shizuoka)
 Sakuragichō Station

Japanese-language surnames